Ulvi Güveneroğlu (born 26 July 1960) is a Turkish former footballer, columnist and manager. He currently works at Beşiktaş, his former club, as Chief Scout .

Career

Club
He started playing football in Elazığspor and joined Beşiktaş in 1979 and served his club throughout his career. Played 422 times in domestic league (411 times in starting line up), he also played in European Cups, played 11 matches in Champions League and 6 times in UEFA Cup.

Managerial
He worked in several clubs since the early 2000s at clubs such as Gençlerbirliği, Gaziantepspor, İstanbulspor, Trabzonspor, Elazığspor, and Erzurumspor. In March 2010, he signed for Beşiktaş, quitting his position in Erzurumspor.

Honours
 Beşiktaş
 Turkish League: 5
 Presidential Cup: 4
 Chancellor Cup: 1
 TSYD Cup: 6

Individual
Beşiktaş J.K. Squads of Century (Bronze Team)

References

External links
 Profile at TFF
 Manegarial Movements at TFF
 Profile on Beşiktaş official website

1960 births
Living people
People from Keban, Elazığ
Association football defenders
Kurdish sportspeople
Turkish football managers
Süper Lig players
Beşiktaş J.K. footballers
Turkey under-21 international footballers
Turkish footballers